Maxim Mehmet (born 2 July 1975) is a German film actor. He inherited his Turkish surname from his Crimean Tatar grandfather. He lived with his spouse in Berlin before he moved to Vienna.

Selected filmography 
 NVA (2005)
 A Hero's Welcome (2008)
 The Red Baron (2008)
 Tatort (since 2008, TV series)
 Ein Job (2008)
  (2008)
 Men in the City (2009)
  (2009)
 The Good Neighbour (2011)
 Faust (2011)
  (2012, TV film)
 Generation War (2013, TV miniseries)
  (2014, TV film)
 My Skinny Sister (2015)
 Heidi (2015)

External links

References 

1975 births
Living people
German male film actors
Actors from Kassel
German people of Crimean Tatar descent
German people of Turkish descent
21st-century German male actors
German expatriates in Austria